Francis Repellin (born 4 March 1969) is a French nordic combined skier who competed from 1987 to 1993. He won a silver medal in the 3 x 10 km team event at the 1991 FIS Nordic World Ski Championships in Val di Fiemme.

Repellin's best individual finish was 2nd twice ([1988] - Austria, 1989 - Norway).

External links

1969 births
Living people
French male Nordic combined skiers
Olympic Nordic combined skiers of France
Nordic combined skiers at the 1988 Winter Olympics
Nordic combined skiers at the 1992 Winter Olympics
FIS Nordic World Ski Championships medalists in Nordic combined
Université Savoie-Mont Blanc alumni